Video is the ninth studio album by Polish group 2 Plus 1, released in 1985 by Savitor. The album was a follow-up to the highly successful 1983's Bez limitu and retained similar musical direction. The band have been working on this LP with popular songwriters Maciej Zembaty and John Porter, and the latter also contributed vocals in "Chińskie latawce". The album was preceded by the release of the single "Wielki mały człowiek" in 1984, which became the band's last big hit. Video hasn't been yet released in CD format.

Track listing 
Side A:
 "Wielki, mały człowiek" 
 "Samo życie (Chmury umysłu)" – 4:05
 "Chińskie latawce" – 3:50
 "Naga plaża" – 3:40
 "Balet rąk" – 3:45

Side B:
 "Video" – 4:20
 "Koszmar" – 3:00
 "Ma-czun-ga-loo" – 3:45
 "Pij moje łzy" – 3:05
 "Dawno, dawno temu" – 4:45

External links 
 Video on Discogs

References 

1985 albums
2 Plus 1 albums
Polish-language albums